ETD may refer to:

Science and technology
 Eustachian tube dysfunction, a disorder of the middle ear
 Everhart–Thornley detector
 Explosives trace detector or explosive trace detection
 Eye-tracking device, an experiment on the International Space Station
 Electron-transfer dissociation
 End-of-train device

Businesses and organizations
 Club of Four, an alliance of French truck manufacturers
 Estuary Transit District, an American transit operator
 ICAO designator for Etihad Airways, an Emirati airline
 Exoplanet Transit Database, a database of exoplanet transit observations
 Etadunna Airstrip, IATA airport code "ETD"

Other uses
 Electronic Theses and Dissertations, a term used by librarians for a class of institutional repository item
 Estimated time of departure
 Exchange-traded derivative contract, a financial instrument
 Spyro: Enter the Dragonfly, a 2002 platform video game